Francesc Pardo i Artigas (26 June 1946 – 31 March 2022) was a Spanish Roman Catholic prelate. He was bishop of Girona from 2008 until his death.

References

1946 births
2022 deaths
Bishops of Girona
21st-century Roman Catholic bishops in Spain
Bishops appointed by Pope Benedict XVI